Rudbeckia alpicola, the showy coneflower, Washington coneflower, or Wenatchee mountain coneflower. It is a perennial flowering plant native to Washington state in the United States.

References

alpicola
Plants described in 1899